Stelligera is a genus of sponges belonging to the family Stelligeridae.

The species of this genus are found in Western Europe.

Species:

Stelligera columnata 
Stelligera montagui 
Stelligera mutila 
Stelligera nux 
Stelligera rigida 
Stelligera stuposa

References

Sponges